The Wake Forest University Demon Deacons men's soccer team is an NCAA Division I college soccer team composed of students attending Wake Forest University in Winston-Salem, North Carolina. They achieved their greatest result in 2007, winning the 2007 Division I Men's College Cup. Like all sports teams from Wake Forest, men's soccer competes in the Atlantic Coast Conference (ACC). The Deacons play their home matches at Spry Stadium on the campus of Wake Forest.

History

Wake Forest fielded its first team in 1980, under the coaching of George Kennedy. The Deacons went 12–9–1 in their first season. They won their first ACC game that season, defeating Maryland 2–1. Coach Kennedy led Wake Forest through 1985 finishing with a 62–55–12 overall record and 6–27–3 in the ACC. Walt Chyzowych took over the program in 1986 until his death just prior to the 1994 season. Coach Chyzowych took the Deacons to a 77–59–22 overall record and 15–25–7 in the ACC in his eight seasons. The Deacons played in their first NCAA Tournament in 1988, losing in the first round to North Carolina. Since 1988, Wake Forest has reached the NCAA tournament 15 times. Jay Vidovich, an assistant under Coach Chyzowych, was named Head Coach in 1994. In 19 seasons under Coach Vidovich, the Deacons went 254–103–48 overall and 65–44–22 in the ACC.

To date, Wake Forest has won the ACC Regular Season Title in 2002, 2004, 2006, 2008, 2009, 2015, and 2017. They won the ACC Tournament in 1989, 2016, and 2017. With their inclusion in the 2009 College Cup, the Demon Deacons reached four consecutive College Cups, becoming the ninth team in NCAA history to achieve this feat.

2007 NCAA Champions
The most successful season in team history took place in 2007, when Wake Forest won the NCAA Division I Championship in a 2–1 decision over Ohio State. It marked the program's only championship to date. During their championship run, the No. 2 seeded Deacons defeated Furman 1–0, No. 15 West Virginia 3–1, and No. 10 Notre Dame 2–1 in overtime to reach the College Cup. In the semifinals, Marcus Tracy scored twice in a 2–0 win over Virginia Tech. In the final, Wake Forest scored two second half goals to come from behind to defeat Ohio State 2–1 to win the National Championship.

Current squad

Technical Staff

Former players playing professional soccer
Updated January 12, 2023
The players in bold have senior international caps.

  Luis Argudo (2016–2017) plays for the Pittsburgh Riverhounds
  Jon Bakero (2014–2017) plays for Pontevedra
  Nico Benalcazar (2019–2021) plays for NYCFC
  Machop Chol (2017–2020) plays for Atlanta United and has 2 caps for South Sudan
  Steven Echevarria (2014–2017) plays for Colorado Springs Switchbacks
  Omir Fernandez (2017–2018) plays for New York Red Bulls II
  Akira Fitzgerald (2007–2010) plays for the Richmond Kickers
  Michael Gamble (2012–2015) plays for Loudoun United
  Logan Gdula (2015–2019) plays for Hartford Athletic
  Ian Harkes (2013–2016) plays for Dundee United
  Calvin Harris (2019–2020) plays for Colorado Rapids
  Jack Harrison (2015) plays for Leeds United
  Alistair Johnston (2018–2019) plays for Celtic and has 33 caps for Canada
  Alex Knox (2016) plays for FC Tucson
  Collin Martin (2012) plays for San Diego Loyal
  Justin McMaster (2017–2020) has 1 cap for Jamaica
  Mark McKenzie (2017) plays for Genk
  Sean Okoli (2011–2013) plays for Orange County
  Andrew Pannenberg (2017–2020) plays for Houston Dynamo 2
  Isaiah Parente (2018–2020) plays for Columbus Crew 2
  Jalen Robinson (2012–2013) plays for Loudoun United
  Brandon Servania (2017) plays for FC Dallas and has 1 cap for the United States
  Ema Twumasi (2016–2017) plays for FC Dallas

Wake Forest seasons
 *Denotes Current Season.  Statistics subject to change

Awards
M.A.C. Hermann Trophy Winner:

 Marcus Tracy – 2008
 Ian Harkes – 2016
 Jon Bakero – 2017

ACC Coach of the Year:

 George Kennedy – 1981
 Jay Vidovich – 2002, 2004, 2006, 2008, 2009
 Bobby Muuss – 2015, 2016, 2017, 2018

ACC Offensive Player of the Year:

 Jeremiah White – 2003
 Scott Sealy – 2004
 Corben Bone – 2009
 Jack Harrison – 2015
 Ian Harkes – 2016
 Jon Bakero – 2017
 Omir Fernandez – 2018

ACC Midfielder of the Year:
 Bruno Lapa – 2018

ACC Defensive Player of the Year:

 Michael Parkhurst – 2004
 Ike Opara – 2008, 2009
 Kevin Politz – 2017

ACC Freshman of the Year:

 Justin Moose – 2002
 Corben Bone – 2007
 Jack Harrison – 2015

All-Americans

All-ACC Players
 The players are all first team All-ACC, unless otherwise noted

 (*) Denotes 2nd Team All-ACC

Players in the MLS SuperDraft

See also
 2012 Wake Forest Demon Deacons men's soccer team

References

External links

 

 
1980 establishments in North Carolina
Association football clubs established in 1980